La Ciudad de los Árboles (The City of the Trees) is the eighth studio album by Spanish folk metal group Mägo de Oz, it was released on 6 November 2007. It comes in Digibook format and includes a DVD.

The first single of the album is "Y Ahora Voy a Salir (Ranxeira)", a tribute to Mexico in ranchera style.

The second single of the album is "Deja de Llorar (Y Vuélvete a Levantar)"

Tracks
 El Espíritu del Bosque (Intro) (The Spirit Of The Forest) - 1:46
 La Ciudad de los Árboles (The City Of the Trees) - 6:02
 Mi Nombre es Rock & Roll (My Name Is Rock & Roll) - 6:03
 El Rincón de los Sentidos (The Corner of Senses) - 4:39
 Deja de Llorar (Y Vuélvete a Levantar) (Stop Crying And Stand Up Again) - 4:18
 La Canción de los Deseos (The Song of Desires) - 4:01
 Y Ahora Voy a Salir (Ranxeira) (And Now I'm Going to Leave [ranchera version]) - 3:53
 Runa Llena* (Full Rune) - 4:46
 Resacosix en la Barra (cover version of Queen's "'39") - 3:47
 No Queda sino Batirnos (There's no option but to Fight) - 4:19
 Sin Ti, Sería Silencio (Parte II) (Without You, It Would Be Silence) - 4:42
 Si Molesto, Me Quedo (If I Disturb, I Stay) - 4:38
 El Espíritu del Bosque II (Outro) (The Spirit Of the Forest II) - 1:15

 * A play on the phrase "Full Moon", in Spanish "Luna Llena".

2007 albums
Mägo de Oz albums